Mukhtar Kalilauly Umarov (Mūhtar Qalilaūly Umarov; sometimes credited as Mukhtar K. Umarov, born 2 December 1987) is a Kazakh film director, actor and screenwriter. He was born in Alma-Ata, Kazakh Soviet Socialist Republic. In 2015, Umarov was presented the First Republic Award of Film and Television - Jas Didar  for the film, Invasion.

Biography
In 1987, Umarov graduated from the graphic design school of Symbat. From 2011 to 2014, he worked in television as web designer and producer. His first notable role was in the film Invasion, which succeeded in winning of Best Visual Effects award.

Filmography

External links

 

Kazakhstani screenwriters
Kazakhstani film directors
21st-century Kazakhstani male actors
People from Almaty
1987 births
Living people
People from Kyzylorda